The Hague Street explosion occurred on February 4, 1850, in New York City, when a boiler exploded at a printing press manufacturer. The blast killed at least 67 people, injured around 30, and sent thousands running into the streets. According to news reports at the time, the head of the boiler was carried up through all six of the building's stories and finally tore off the building's roof, while the building itself lifted  in the air, causing it to collapse in on itself. One report stated,

The rescue effort was led by New York City Mayor Caleb Smith Woodhull and the New York City Police Department, with assistance from the fire department. About 100 rescuers were divided into three teams, working in shifts. The last person to be rescued was a young boy who had been trapped for 17 hours under a mass of wood and iron beams. The boy died of burn injuries shortly after his rescue; his story featured prominently in newspaper reports of the day.

References

Building collapses in the United States
History of New York City
February 1850 events
1850 disasters in the United States
Disasters in New York City
1850 in New York (state)
Explosions in 1850
1850s in New York City